Zonie is a slang term for:

 Zonian, somebody from the former Panama Canal Zone
 Somebody from Arizona